Nicole Melichar-Martinez and Daria Saville defeated Lucie Hradecká and Sania Mirza in the final, 5–7, 7–5, [10–6] to win the doubles tennis title at the 2022 Internationaux de Strasbourg.

Alexa Guarachi and Desirae Krawczyk were the defending champions but chose not to participate.

Elise Mertens was in contention for the world no. 1 doubles ranking, but she and partner Diane Parry lost in the semifinals to Melichar-Martinez and Saville.

Seeds

Draw

Draw

References

External links 
Main draw

Internationaux de Strasbourg - Doubles
2022 Doubles